Cefn Albion Football Club is a Welsh football club from the village of Cefn Mawr in Wrexham County Borough. The club was founded in 2013 and plays in the Ardal Leagues North East, in the third tier of the Welsh football league system.

History
The team took its name from an older club also named Cefn Albion who existed from 1967 to 1992, who in turn took their name from an even older team who had existed as far back as 1902. The 1967-1992 club merged with Druids United to form Cefn Druids in 1992. 

The team began playing in the 2014–15 season in the Clwyd East Football League (fifth tier). It won the league, scoring 150 goals in 22 games and losing only once. The team also won three cups that season, and lost a fourth in the final. 

The following season, the team achieved second consecutive promotion when won it won the Welsh National League Division One.

In October 2015, Cefn Albion player Nicholas Williams broke the leg of AFC Brynford's Andrew Barlow in a league cup game. The following August, he was found guilty of grievous bodily harm and sentenced to a year in custody when the jury decided unanimously that it was a deliberate act.

On 29 September 2018, Cefn Albion defeated FC Queens Park 3–2 to qualify for the Welsh Cup for the first time. On 19 October, in the first round, they defeated Dolgellau Athletic 7–1, to earn a trip to Bangor City in the next stage. There, they lost 6–1 away.

On 16 March 2019, Cefn Albion beat STM Sports 3–1 to reach the FAW Trophy final for the first time in their history. On 13 April, they won the final 4–0 against Pontardawe Town at Park Avenue, Aberystwyth. The semi-final was marred by crowd trouble and both teams ordered to pay fines to the FAW, though accusations that Cefn Albion fans were racist were not proven.

In 2020, the Welsh National League was dissolved and Cefn Albion were placed in the new Ardal Leagues North East, still in the third tier.

Seasons

Honours

League
Welsh National League Division One
Winner (1): 2016

Clwyd East Football League
Winner (1): 2015

Cups

FAW Trophy
Winner (1): 2018–19

Welsh National League Premier Division League Cup
Winner (2): 2016–17, 2018–19

North East Wales FA Junior (Horace Wynne) Cup
Winner (2): 1976–77, 2014–15

North East Wales FA Challenge Cup 
Winners: 1977–78

Presidents Cup
Winners: 2014–15

Premier Cup:
Winners: 2014–15

Clwyd Cup:
Runners-up: 2014–15

References

External links
Official website

Welsh National League (Wrexham Area) Premier Division clubs
2013 establishments in Wales
Association football clubs established in 2013
Football clubs in Wales
Football clubs in Wrexham
Ardal Leagues clubs
Clwyd East Football League clubs